Joseph-Aimé-Paul Noyon (3 October 1888 – 15 October 1962) was a French organist and composer of classical music.

Biography 
Joseph Noyon was born at Cherbourg (France). He studied organ and church music at the Basilica of the Holy Trinity, Cherbourg, and later became the organist at the Church of St. Clément. In 1904 he moved to Paris to study at the École Niedermeyer, where he was student of Charles Wilfrid de Bériot, Paul Viardot, Alfred Marichelle and Henri Dallier and later of Paul Vidal at the Conservatoire de Paris. In later years he became himself teacher of harmony and music theory at the École Niedermeyer.

During his musical career Joseph Noyon was organist and teacher at the Great Organ of the church at Saint-Cloud, teacher at Notre-Dame-d'Auteuil, accompanist to the choirs at Sainte-Chapelle, director of the choirs of the Radiodiffusion-Télévision Française and teacher at the church of Saint-Honoré-d'Eylau for 12 years. He died at Boulogne-Billancourt.

Compositions 
He composed more than 400 works, mainly sacred music, among them are

Hymne à la nuit (La Nuit de Rameau), for mixed chorus a capella
L'enfance de l'Immaculée for soloists, female chorus, organ and orchestra (dedicated to Rose-Marie Paillet)

Motets 
 Cantate Domino, mixed chorus, 2 organs, trumpets and trombones
 In Me Gratia (motet à la Sainte Vierge), for male chorus
 Jérusalem acclame, for chorus, soloists and organ
 Laudate Dominum in sanctis (Ps. 150), for 2 voices and organ
 Panis Angelicus, for mixed voices and organ
 Notre Père, qui êtes aux cieux, for mixed voices and organ
 Tantum Solennel, dit du Congrès, for male chorus, mixed voices, 2 organs, trumpets and trombones

Masses 
 Messe de la Nativité sur des Noëls populaires, for 2 or 3 mixed voices, 4 mixed voices and organ (1942)
 Messe brève, for chorus and organ
 Messe en l’honneur de Frères des écoles chrétiennes, for 4 mixed voices, organ and instruments ad lib.
 Messe en l’honneur de Saint Augustin, for 4 mixed voices, organ and instruments ad lib.
 Requiem, for soloists, chorus and orchestra (1949)
 Saint Jean-Baptiste de la Salle, oratorio in 7 partes for soloists, chorus, orchestra and organ (1950)
 Messe solennelle Pax Christi, for mixed chorus, 2 organs, trumpets and trombones (1953)

Organ 
 Allegretto en sol
 Élévation en sol majeur (1924)
 Final en ut majeur
 Variations sur un vieux Noël

Piano 
 Impromptu
 Ouverture de concert
 Les heures roses
 Danses grecques

Instrumental compositions 
 Berceuse for violin and piano (1919)
 Arioso for violin and strings
 Elégie for horn and organ or piano
 Lamento for cello
 Aria for string quintet
 Concerto en ré majeur, for organ and orchestra
 Divertissement Pastoral, for oboe
 Esquisses normandes, for wind quartet
 Nocturne
 Marche funèbre

References 
 Musica et Memoria detailed biography in French.

External links 
 

1888 births
1962 deaths
People from Manche
French classical organists
French male organists
French classical composers
French male classical composers
French composers of sacred music
20th-century organists
20th-century French male musicians
Male classical organists